G. atlanticus may refer to:

Galeus atlanticus, the Atlantic sawtail catshark, a ground shark species
Glaucus atlanticus, a nudibranch species